Smithfield was a village in Smithfield Township, Jefferson County, Ohio, United States. The population was 869 at the 2010 census. It is part of the Weirton–Steubenville, WV-OH Metropolitan Statistical Area. In 2019, Smithfield voted to dissolve itself.

History
Smithfield was platted in 1803. A post office called Smithfield has been in operation since 1814.

During Morgan's Raid, a Union victory in the Civil War in 1863, Confederate Brid. Gen. John Hunt Morgan 
traveled through the Moorefield, Harrisville, New Athens, 
Smithfield, New Alexandria, Wintersville, Two Ridge, Richmond, East Springfield, Bergholz, and Monroeville on his way to defeat at the Battle of Salineville.

In 2016, Smithfield survived an initiative to dissolve the village into surrounding Smithfield Township. However, Smithfield voted to dissolve itself in November 2019.

Geography
Smithfield is located at  (40.270853, -80.780493).

Demographics

2010 census
As of the census of 2010, there were 869 people, 362 households, and 234 families living in the village. The racial makeup of the village was 86.7% White, 11.3% African American, 0.1% Pacific Islander, 0.3% from other races, and 1.6% from two or more races. Hispanic or Latino of any race were 1.2% of the population.

There were 362 households, of which 28.7% had children under the age of 18 living with them, 48.3% were married couples living together, 10.2% had a female householder with no husband present, 6.1% had a male householder with no wife present, and 35.4% were non-families. 30.9% of all households were made up of individuals, and 14.6% had someone living alone who was 65 years of age or older. The average household size was 2.35 and the average family size was 2.90.

The median age in the village was 42.9 years. 22.4% of residents were under the age of 18; 7.2% were between the ages of 18 and 24; 23.3% were from 25 to 44; 29.8% were from 45 to 64; and 17.3% were 65 years of age or older. The gender makeup of the village was 47.5% male and 52.5% female.

2000 census
As of the census of 2000, there were 867 people, 358 households, and 230 families living in the village. The population density was 904.5 people per square mile (348.7/km). There were 405 housing units at an average density of 422.5 per square mile (162.9/km). The racial makeup of the village was 86.97% White, 9.80% African American, 0.12% Native American, 0.35% from other races, and 2.77% from two or more races. Hispanic or Latino of any race were 0.23% of the population.

There were 358 households, out of which 27.4% had children under the age of 18 living with them, 48.9% were married couples living together, 11.5% had a female householder with no husband present, and 35.5% were non-families. 32.1% of all households were made up of individuals, and 15.6% had someone living alone who was 65 years of age or older. The average household size was 2.34 and the average family size was 2.90.

In the village, the population was spread out, with 24.1% under the age of 18, 6.0% from 18 to 24, 26.1% from 25 to 44, 24.0% from 45 to 64, and 19.8% who were 65 years of age or older. The median age was 40 years. For every 100 females there were 90.5 males. For every 100 females age 18 and over, there were 82.8 males.

The median income for a household in the village was $25,179, and the median income for a family was $30,833. Males had a median income of $33,500 versus $17,813 for females. The per capita income for the village was $13,734. About 21.4% of families and 28.8% of the population were below the poverty line, including 37.0% of those under age 18 and 19.1% of those age 65 or over.

Education
Public education in the village of Smithfield is provided by the Buckeye Local School District.

Notable people
 John Domenick, member of the Ohio House of Representatives
 Samuel Grimshaw, Medal Of Honor recipient
 William Sharon, United States Senator from Nevada
 James Sutherland, Wisconsin State Senator

References

Former municipalities in Ohio
1803 establishments in Ohio
Populated places established in 1803
2019 disestablishments in Ohio
Populated places disestablished in 2019
Unincorporated communities in Jefferson County, Ohio